is an anime TV Special based on the Neo Geo SNK video game, Fatal Fury 2, and is a sequel to the previous TV movie, Fatal Fury: Legend of the Hungry Wolf. The movie was directed by Kazuhiro Furuhashi and once again features character designs by Masami Ōbari. It first aired on July 31, 1993. An English adaptation produced by Viz Communications was released on home video in 1994.

Plot 

After his defeat by Terry Bogard, Geese Howard retreats to the mountains, where he is visited by his half brother, Wolfgang Krauser, who finds out who defeated him. In another part of the country, Terry Bogard meets up with a young boy named Tony who wants to be just like him. Tony witnesses him battle with Kim Kaphwan and asks to be his disciple, but Terry refuses. Later, Terry encounters Krauser and they fight. Terry loses due to his injuries and earlier battle with Kim. Krauser tells him to recover and meet him in Germany at Stroheim Castle. Geese, meanwhile, plans to take down Krauser.

While fighting against Big Bear (Raiden in disguise) in a fighting tournament in Japan, Joe Higashi learns from him that Terry lost his recent fight to Krauser. Upon hearing this, he quickly knocks out Big Bear and his fight promoter, who wanted Joe to continue the match and runs out of the arena (this scene was cut from the English release, but is presented in Japanese with English subtitles on the Diskotek DVD release).

Terry wakes up in Tony's home and learns that he was taken care of by Tony's mother. Tony is not present, and Terry leaves at his mother's behest. Later, Tony notices Terry at the train station and asks him to stay, but Terry refuses. He also forbids Tony to go with him because of his mother, but Tony does so anyway without his knowledge. Terry's defeat causes him to start drinking, and ends up being assaulted by street thugs. Tony helps him, determined to help him straighten up so he can prepare for his next fight with Krauser. Terry, however, is so depressed with his defeat that he throws away his fighting gloves.

In Japan, Mai Shiranui comes to the dojo where Jubei Yamada and Andy Bogard live, wanting to see Andy. The meeting ends unfavorably for Andy, because he is clueless of Mai's affections towards him. Joe appears, telling Andy that his brother lost a fight and has gone underground. Later that night, Jubei tells Andy and Joe about Krauser, which Mai eavesdrops on.

Krauser comes from a noble family, the House of Stroheim, who act as bodyguards to European royal families, but is a cover, as they have actually overthrown governments and started revolts. The head of the House is thus known as "The Emperor of Darkness" and Krauser is the best the family has produced. Jubei also tells Andy and Joe on his sixteenth birthday that he also killed his own father in a fight to be head of the family. In his mansion, Krauser reminisces about his father, recalling the day he was beaten up by him as a child and when he killed him, feeling nothing after his death. A young Geese is shown to have tried to kill the elder Krauser to avenge his mother. Krauser had thwarted the attempted assassination and slashed Geese with his own knife, giving him the long scar running across his left eye.

Back at the dojo, Jubei warns Andy and Joe not to get involved with Krauser, but Andy, angered by his brother's defeat, refuses to listen. Jubei thus challenges Andy for leaving the dojo. Andy wins the match and leaves with Joe to seek revenge. Jubei asks Mai to accompany him.

In a park, a sleeping Terry is roused by some punks who try to rob him, but gets beaten up. Tony learns of Terry's involvement in the fight and subsequent arrest. At the airport, Joe decides to find Terry while Andy, along with Mai, will handle Krauser. Terry is released from prison with Joe's help, but Joe is ashamed to see him in his state and leaves him to his own devices. Tony is still determined to help Terry get out of his drunken depression.

In Germany, Andy and Mai try to find Krauser but learn that he is out of the country on bodyguard duty. Mai uses the opportunity to spend time with Andy, but they end up separating. Mai runs into Laurence Blood, Krauser's right-hand man, who discovered their attempt to find Krauser. Blood defeats Mai and takes her prisoner, but she is rescued by Andy.

Terry is challenged by Axel Hawk and his sparring partner during one of his drinking bouts, with Hawk unconvinced by his drunkenness. Tony ends up fighting Hawk's sparring partner, who reluctantly gives him a working over. During the fight, Terry has a dream of his childhood when he was beaten up and told himself to get stronger so he could avenge his father. A few years after being well trained, he defeated the man who had beaten him up. Awakening, he sees Tony and is reminded of his childhood. Tony is badly beaten, yet never gives up until Hawk's sparring partner refuses to continue. Terry finds out that Tony used his gloves to use his techniques and fight Hawk's partner, and after Tony passes out, Terry puts his gloves and hat back on, challenges Hawk, and wins. He recovers and is eager to take on Krauser again.

In another country, Joe Higashi takes on Krauser in his hotel room on his own in an attempt to avenge Terry, but is unsuccessful and is heavily injured, suffering two dozen broken bones. Along the way to Germany, Terry fears that he is not strong enough to take on Krauser, but the spirits of Lily McGuire and Tung Fu Rue appear before him and tell him that he can win this fight.

Learning of Joe's injuries, Terry and Tony visit him in the hospital where they meet Mai. Joe tells Terry that Andy will meet him at the cemetery where they last went their separate ways. When Andy and Terry meet, they battle each other with everything they have, with the victor getting to fight Krauser. They nearly kill each other, but Terry wins, showcasing his new technique, the Power Geyser.

The next day, Terry and Tony arrive at Stroheim Castle and Terry takes on Krauser. The battle is fierce, with the fighters destroying everything that surrounds them. Terry wins with the Power Geyser, which makes Krauser bleed internally. Congratulating Terry on winning the fight, Krauser throws himself from a damaged wall to his death. Geese greets the news of his death with laughter. Tony and Terry part at a train station, with Tony's mother there to greet him. Tony promises Terry that someday he will be a great martial artist just like him and receives his cap as a memento of their journey.

Characters 
Terry Bogard

Wolfgang Krauser

Tony

Andy Bogard

Joe Higashi

Mai Shiranui

Kim Kaphwan

Jubei Yamada

Axel Hawk

Laurence Blood

Geese Howard

Tung Fu Rue

Big Bear
Voiced by Hisao Egawa (Japanese) (No English voice due to the scene not being dubbed)
Lilly McGuire

References

External links 
 
 

1993 anime films
1993 films
Anime films based on video games
Japanese animated films
Fatal Fury
Martial arts anime and manga
Viz Media anime
Works based on SNK video games
Discotek Media